Sultanpur is a town in Udham Singh Nagar district in the Indian state of Uttarakhand. It is located approximately 15 kilometres from Kashipur and 42 kilometers from Rudrapur.

Location

Sultanpur is located in the Terai tract, which runs from the Uttar Pradesh border to the Haldwani at north. It is at the east bank of the holy Koshi river, which is well known for its illegal mining of sand.

Administration and politics 

Sultanpur patti falls in the Bazpur Legislative assembly of the Uttarakhand state. The local MLA is the current cabinet minister Yashpal Arya. The town is in charge of the Chairman & Executive Officer. It has a committee consisting of a chairman with ward members. It is divided into seven wards for election purposes. Namely Shivnagar, aryanagar, tanda-banjara, gandhinagar, adarshnagar, netanagar and shyamnagar. Municipal elections are held once every five years, with results being decided by popular vote. Elections to the Sultanpur patti were held in 2018, and Rajendra Sharma, an independent politician was elected. Sharma defeated Mohammad Rafi from Congress by 745 votes.

Civil administration 
The local police station is the substation of nearest Bajpur thana, which is headed by a Sub-inspector-level officer.

Transport 
Train service in Sultanpur started in 1905, upon the construction of a branch line by Kumaon Railway connecting Lalkuan line with Kashipur. Sultanpur railway Halt (was station until 2006) lies on the Kashipur-Lalkuan Broad gauge railway line and the city falls under the Izzatnagar railway division of North Eastern Railway Zone of Indian Railways.
A major National highways run through Sultanpur. National Highway 309, which runs from Malaut in Punjab to Pithoragarh in Uttarakhand passes through Sultanpur. Other roads starting from here connect it to Rampur via Maswasi. Sultanpur has no Bus station. The demand of a permanent station is on fire by the locals.

Education 

 Government primary school Sultanpur l
 Government primary school sultanpur ll
 Government Urdumedium school sultanpur 
 Government Girls Intercollege sultanpur
 S.N.sharma Government boys intercollege sultanpur 
 Sarswati shishu vidya mandir Sultanpur
 Government Polytechnic Bazpur. (http://www.gpbazpur.in)

References

Cities and towns in Udham Singh Nagar district